The Warrego Highway is located in southern Queensland, Australia. It connects coastal centres to the south western areas of the state, and is approximately 715 km in length. It takes its name from the Warrego River, which is the endpoint of the highway. The entire highway is part of the National Highway system linking Darwin and Brisbane: formerly National Highway 54, Queensland began to convert to the alphanumeric system much of Australia had adopted in the early-2000s and this road is now designated as National Highway A2.

Route description
The highway commences at the end of the M2 Ipswich Motorway, near Ipswich and runs to Helidon Spa, at the foot of the Great Dividing Range. From there it follows the Toowoomba Bypass to Charlton, west of Toowoomba. The Warrego then crosses the Darling Downs, bypassing the town of Oakey and then passing through the towns of Dalby, Chinchilla and Miles, in the Western Downs.  The highway continues through the towns of Roma and Mitchell in the Maranoa Region of South West Queensland.  After Morven, the A2 Route continues north-west along the Landsborough Highway, with the western turnoff continuing the Warrego Highway down to its terminus at Charleville.

The section of highway between Ipswich and Charlton is mostly motorway grade; a four lane divided highway with motorway-style on-ramps and off-ramps.  At a point between Charlton and Oakey the highway merges from 4 to 2 lanes (however, throughout 2017-2019, the highway was planned to be duplicated up until Oakey)  Then, the highway mostly continues in a straight line with minimal turns.  At Dalby, the highway briefly returns to 4 lanes (where a longer stretch of the highway was planned to be duplicated in 2017).  The Warrego then continues as a rural 2 lane highway, until Charleville.

Terrain
The Warrego Highway's lowest point along its length is 3.69 m just east of where it crosses the Bremer River near Ipswich, and its highest elevation is at the top of the Great Dividing Range on the Toowoomba Bypass.

Speed zones
Ipswich Motorway - Blacksoil 100 km/h
Blacksoil - Toowoomba Bypass merge 100 km/h, with a drop to 80 km/h and/or 60 km/h through some towns
Great Dividing Range (Toowoomba Bypass to Charlton) 80 km/h to 100 km/h
Charlton - Kingsthorpe 90 km/h
Kingsthorpe - Dalby 100 km/h except through Jondaryan, which is 80 km/h.
Dalby - 60 km/h
Dalby - Chinchilla 100 km/h except running through towns, which speeds can drop to 60 km/h
Chinchilla-Charleville 110 km/h except running through towns, which speeds can drop to 60 km/h

Towns along the route

From east to west, the highway passes through or close to the cities and major towns of:
 Ipswich (Bypassed)
 Gatton (Bypassed)
 Toowoomba (Bypassed)
 Oakey (Bypassed)
 Dalby
 Chinchilla
 Miles
 Roma
 Mitchell
 Morven
 Charleville

Gallery

History
In January 2011, the former highway was extensively damaged where it crossed the Toowoomba Range.  This included land slips, shoulder and embankment erosion, the erosion of drains and damaged rock fall netting.  The road wasn't fully repaired with all four lanes open until September 2011.

The Toowoomba Bypass was completed in September 2019 and bypasses the urban area of Toowoomba and provides a better crossing of the Great Dividing Range. Warrego Highway (A2) was rerouted via the bypass between Helidon Spa (in the east) and the interchange at Charlton (in the west). The bypass continues as the Gore Highway (A39) and is 41 km in length. The original section of Warrego Highway through Toowoomba was renamed Toowoomba Connection Road (A21).

Major works
 1957 - Helidon bypass.  New road built to bypass Helidon including a steel and concrete bridge over Lockyer Creek opened by the end of June 1957.
 1959 - Ipswich bypass.  New 8 mile long bypass including a steel and concrete bridge over the Bremer River built to bypass Ipswich City, shortening the highway by 2 miles.  The date of opening was Tuesday, July 28th.
 1971 - Marburg bypass.  1.9 miles (3.1 km) of new road built to bypass Marburg, including bridges over Queen Street and Black Snake Creek.
 1971 - Blanchview deviation. 5.15 miles (8.3 km) of new road that replaced the old twisting route built in the late 1920s.  The deviation opened to traffic in December of that year.
 1974 - Minden Range deviation.  2.6 km of new road built to bypass a sub-standard section of road over the Minden Range.
 1976 - Hattonvale to Laidley Creek duplication. 8 km of road upgraded to four lanes at a cost of $870,000.
 1989 - Gatton bypass. 20 km of new road built to bypass Gatton, Grantham and Helidon at a cost of $20 million opened in November 1989.
 1994 - Dinmore Duplication. 2.7 km of road duplicated to four lanes from the railway at Dinmore to the Bremer River bridge. A grade-separated interchange at River Road was also built. 
 2002 - Yaralla Deviation.  18.5 km realignment built to bypass a notorious section prone to flooding west of Dalby.
 2017 - Toowoomba to Oakey Duplication Stage 1.  Highway duplicated from Nugent Pinch Road to west of Charlton.  
 2018 - Toowoomba to Oakey Duplication Stage 2.  Highway duplicated from Charlton to Kingsthorpe including an interchange at Kingsthorpe-Haden Road

Future developments

Dalby Eastern & Western Access Upgrades

These upgrades will begin in 2017 and will fully duplicate the highway to 4 lanes, between Cecil Plains Road and Black Street.  4 new traffic signals will be added at Black Street, Jandowae Road, Orpen Street and a pedestrian signal near Owen Street.

Roads of Strategic Importance upgrades
The Roads of Strategic Importance initiative, last updated in March 2022, includes the following project for the Warrego Highway.

Priority section upgrades
A project to upgrade priority sections of the Toowoomba to Ipswich corridor, including the Warrego Highway and surrounding state and council roads, at an estimated cost of $75 million, was in planning in May 2020.

Other upgrades

Brimblecombe Road intersection
A project to upgrade the Brimblecombe Road intersection between Toowoomba and Dalby, at a cost of $2,75 million, was completed in December 2021.

Gatton heavy vehicle decoupling facility
A project to provide a heavy vehicle decoupling facility at Gatton was completed by November 2021.

Master plan Ipswich to Toowoomba
A master plan for the upgrade of the highway between Ipswich and Toowoomba has been developed at a cost of $6.78 million.

Haigslea-Amberley Road intersection
A project to plan the upgrade of the Haigslea-Amberley Road intersection, at a cost of $799,000, was in progress in May 2022.

Mount Crosby Road intersection
A project to plan the upgrade of the Mount Crosby Road intersection, at a cost of $5 million, was in progress in July 2021.

Other items of interest

Darren Lockyer Way
On 28 September 2011 the Queensland Main Roads Minister, Craig Wallace, announced that an 85 km stretch of the Warrego Highway was to be renamed Darren Lockyer Way, in honour of the retired Brisbane Broncos, Queensland and Australian rugby league captain. The section of road renamed is from Riverview to the bottom of the Toowoomba Range at Withcott. Special signage including "Welcome to Darren Lockyer Way" has been erected.

Major intersections

See also

 Highways in Australia
 List of highways in Queensland

References

External links

Highways in Queensland
South East Queensland
Darling Downs
South West Queensland